The Capt. John Gunnison House is a historic house on Goshen Center Road in Goshen, New Hampshire.  Built in 1812, it is one of the town's finer examples of Federal architecture.  It was the childhood home and likely birthplace of John Williams Gunnison, a military officer who led exploratory expeditions in Colorado.  The house was listed on the National Register of Historic Places in 1979.

Description and history
It is a two-story wood-frame structure, with a hip roof and clapboarded exterior. Its main facade has five bays, with the door centered, with flanking sidelight windows and a false fanlight above. A single-story porch extends across the center three bays, supported by round columns. Two interior chimneys rise behind the main roof ridge, and only one of its original four fireplaces survives. The interior includes a number of 19th-century features, including stencilwork and feather painting.

The house was built in 1812 on an  parcel that was one of the first to be granted in the town, to Samuel Gunnison.  Explorer John Williams Gunnison was born in 1812, so this may have been the place of his birth. Gunnison was killed by Native Americans in 1853 during an exploratory expedition in what is now Utah. Geographic features in Colorado, where he also led expeditions, bear his name. The house was sold out of the Gunnison family by 1890.

See also
National Register of Historic Places listings in Sullivan County, New Hampshire

References

Houses on the National Register of Historic Places in New Hampshire
Federal architecture in New Hampshire
Houses completed in 1812
Houses in Goshen, New Hampshire
National Register of Historic Places in Sullivan County, New Hampshire
1812 establishments in New Hampshire